Sublabial may refer to:
 Sublabial scales on reptiles
 Sublabial route of administration of drugs